XXXenophile is an American comic book series, published by Palliard Press and later Studio Foglio.  It is an anthology of short, whimsical, erotic fantasy and science fiction stories, written and penciled by Phil Foglio.  Each story is inked by a different artist.

The series' general emphasis is on the enjoyment of sexuality as a playful activity.  Foglio satirizes numerous plot elements of fantasy and science fiction, such as time travel, cloning, robots, deals with the devil, love potions, and geasa. It portrays a variety of sexual activities, including "oral sex, anal sex, group sex, masturbation, voyeurism, double penetration, inter-racial (literally), bestiality (although generally with an animal possessing intelligence), mild sado-masochism, homosexuality (female, in every issue; male, just in the last issue), exhibitionism, sex with any number of devices, necrophilia (specifically sex with a ghost), prostitution, and various others, including some that were only possible in micro-gravity". Foglio cited rape, mind control, pedophilia, "classical necrophilia", excretion, snuff porn, branding, piercing, heavy sadomasochism, and spanking as topics that he did not find appealing and would not write about. He recalls: "I had a pediatrician tell me if she had a choice between a young teenage boy finding XXXenophile and Batman, she’d throw him XXXenophile because it teaches much healthier interactions. Of course, this particular pediatrician would not go on the record, and I would not ask her to, but it still gave me good feelings for the day".

Publication history
XXXenophile was published as a series of ten comic books from 1989 to 1995. In 1994, the contents of the first five issues were reprinted in The XXXenophile Big Book O' Fun. In 1997 and 1998, the contents of the ten issues were reprinted in the five-volume The XXXenophile Collection series; each volume contained a number of stories from the original comics (not in their original publication order) plus a new story (generally a second look at characters from an earlier story such as the superhero Orgasm Lass and her four-armed male sidekick Foreplay). The additional stories were compiled separately in a final, eleventh issue of the comic book in 1998. A sixth volume of The XXXenophile Collection, with a new 64-page story, was published in 2000. In 2004 Studio Foglio released XXXenophile Quick and Dirty, a 20-page booklet of unreleased material. The series is on hiatus on the initiative of the Foglios until their children are of appropriate age for the material.

Palliard Press published a related series, XXXenophile Presents, which presented stories by other creators, each story taking up an entire issue. There were five issues published, with stories by Julie Ann Sczesny, Colin Upton (two), and Charlie Wise (two).

Card game
A XXXenophile collectible card game based on the comic was also created.

In 2001 this game was reworked into a non-adult, non-collectible card game called Girl Genius: The Works, based on the Foglios' comic Girl Genius.

Contributors
XXXenophile stories were inked by a variety of well-known and lesser-known artists:
Mark Nelson,
Doug Rice,
Julie Ann Sczesny,
Hilary Barta,
Matt Howarth,
Delphyne Mori,
Gordon Purcell,
Randy Crawford,
William Messner-Loebs,
Brian Thomas,
Ruth Thompson,
Paul Guinan,
Lea Hernandez,
Adam Hughes,
John Workman,
Donna Barr,
Stephen R. Bissette,
David Cherry,
Shon Howell,
Bill Willingham,
David Lee Anderson,
Stephen DeStefano,
Tom Verré,
Vicky Wyman,
Frank Kelly Freas,
Rantz Hoseley,
Barb Kaalberg,
Steve Sullivan,
Lee Burks,
Lela Dowling,
Kevin Eastman,
Peter Hsu,
Kelley Jones,
Geof Darrow,
Quinton Hoover,
Terrie Smith,
Neil Vokes,
Dennis Clark,
Bob Eggleton,
Michael T. Gilbert,
Susan Van Camp,
Mike Christian,
Colleen Doran,
Pam Eklund,
Shepherd Hendrix, and
Brian Snøddy (two stories).

References

Further reading

External links
h2g2 XXXenophile Edited Guide Entry
Mile High Comics' XXXenophile listing

1989 comics debuts
1995 comics endings
Erotic comics
Obscenity controversies in comics
Studio Foglio titles